The Yorktown Wrecks is an expansive archaeologically sensitive area of Virginia's York River, in whose waters significant naval remnants of the American Revolutionary War are located.  As a result of surveys conducted in the 1970s, at least ten sunken vessels sunken or scuttled around the time of the 1781 Siege of Yorktown have been identified.  In the days preceding the siege, American and French naval forces sank a number of British vessels off Yorktown, and General Charles Cornwallis ordered the scuttling of other ships.  At the end of the siege and the British surrender, at least twenty-six British vessels were unaccounted for, and are believed to lie in the York River.

The site was listed on the National Register of Historic Places in 1973;  it was the first underwater listing on the register.

See also
National Register of Historic Places listings in York County, Virginia

References

Further reading
 
 
 

Archaeological sites on the National Register of Historic Places in Virginia
Maritime incidents in 1781
National Register of Historic Places in York County, Virginia
Virginia in the American Revolution
Shipwrecks on the National Register of Historic Places in Virginia
American Revolution on the National Register of Historic Places